The Canadian Mathematical Bulletin is a mathematics journal, established in 1958 and published quarterly by the Canadian Mathematical Society. The current editors-in-chief of the journal are Antonio Lei and Javad Mashreghi.  The journal publishes short articles in all areas of mathematics that are of sufficient interest to the general mathematical public.

Abstracting and indexing
The journal is abstracted in:
 Mathematical Reviews 
 Web of Science
 Scopus 
 Zentralblatt MATH

See also

 Canadian Journal of Mathematics

References

External links 
 

Mathematics journals
Multilingual journals
Cambridge University Press academic journals
Quarterly journals
Academic journals associated with learned and professional societies of Canada